Green Island is an island in Mackinac County, Michigan. The island is located in the Straits of Mackinac in Lake Michigan. The island is uninhabited and covered in thicket with a few trees scattered throughout. It is privately owned.

References

Islands of Mackinac County, Michigan
Uninhabited islands of Michigan
Islands of Lake Michigan in Michigan
Private islands of Michigan
Private islands of the Great Lakes